Talismán may refer to:

 Talismán (ship), a Peruvian Navy ship
 Talismán metro station, in Mexico City
 Talismán (Mexico City Metrobús), a BRT station in Mexico City
 Talismán, the ring name of professional wrestler Arturo Beristain
 Talismán, Jr., a ring name of professional wrestler Antonio Gómez Medina
 Talismán, Chiapas, a town in Tuxtla Chico
 "Talismán" (composition), a musical composition by Juan María Solare